St. Columba's School is a historic school building located at Schenectady, Schenectady County, New York. It was built in 1923, and is a three-story, reddish-brown brick building in the Collegiate Gothic style.  It features white Indiana
limestone buttress amortizements, pinnacles, and a crenellated parapet.  The school closed in 1974, and since 1976 the building has housed the local Boys and Girls Club.

It was added to the National Register of Historic Places in 2015.

References

School buildings on the National Register of Historic Places in New York (state)
Collegiate Gothic architecture in New York (state)
School buildings completed in 1923
Schools in Schenectady County, New York
National Register of Historic Places in Schenectady County, New York
1923 establishments in New York (state)